Ivan Vivian Harris (born June 17, 1978) is a Guyanese former professional boxer who competed from 1997 to 2018. He held the WBA super lightweight title from 2002 to 2005.

Amateur career
After Harris arrived in the U.S., he began his amateur boxing career, racking up 45 wins, 5 losses, and 32 KO's. In 1995, Harris won the Metros championship, and the New York Golden Gloves two years later. Following these successes, Harris turned professional in 1997.

Professional career

Harris made his professional debut on November 4, 1997, when he fought Levi Long and KO'd him in the first minute of the first round. In December of the same year, Harris defeated Adam Salas, forcing the referee to stop the bout prematurely.

This pattern of aggressive fighting continued for years. Harris won against several competitors, until he faced Ray Oliveira in early 2000. Harris was not able to match Oliveira's overall punch output, and consequently lost a 10-round decision. Later that year, Harris was matched against Ivan Robinson, a fight that many thought he convincingly won. However, due to New Jersey's consensus scoring system, Harris was forced to accept a draw.

WBA light welterweight champion
On October 19, 2002, Harris defeated Diobelys Hurtado and captured the WBA junior welterweight title. Harris defended his title twice in the next two years against Souleyman Mbaye and Oktay Urkal, respectively.

In June 2005 Harris was set to fight Colombian boxer Carlos Maussa as a part of the Thunder and Lighting Floyd Mayweather Jr. v. Arturo Gatti pay-per-view. Harris started the fight aggressively, and hurt Maussa in the first round. He continued to apply pressure, gunning for a knockout. However Maussa survived, and started to get stronger as the fight went on.

At this point, Harris grew visibly tired as he desperately tried to score a knockout. However, in the seventh round, Maussa caught Harris with a left hook that sent Harris to the canvas. As the referee began counting, Maussa delivered another punch to Harris as he was down, although Harris was already hurt by the first blow, and the subsequent late punch did not land cleanly. Harris failed to answer the 10-count and the bout was scored as a knockout for Maussa.

Vivian Harris and Junior Witter met on September 6, 2007, in Doncaster, England, fighting for the WBC light welterweight belt. Witter came out more aggressive than usual, winning the first six rounds until knocking Harris out in the seventh with a punishing left hook that caught Harris off-guard. Harris once again fell short of winning a championship, not able to answer the count of 10 in his second straight title fight.

Vivian Harris and Mexican Noe Bolanos met on August 14, 2009, in Tucson, Arizona, in the main event of ESPN's Friday Night Fights. In Round 2, Harris and Bolanos collided heads. Harris stumbled towards his corner and collapsed while the ringside doctor was talking with him. Harris appeared to be conscious but not entirely alert. He left the ring on a stretcher, was allowed to briefly walk around the fighter area, and was taken to a local hospital as a precaution. The referee stopped the fight officially at 40 seconds of Round 2, declaring the match a No Contest. Six months later he fought against Lucas Martin Matthysse, losing by a controversial fourth-round TKO. In his next fight on the undercard of Mora vs. Mosley against futurewelterweight champion Victor Ortiz, Harris was dropped three times in round two, and was dropped a fourth time in the third round for a KO loss to Ortiz.

Returning in 2011 against welterweight Jesse Vargas, Harris was severely battered in the first round, appearing unprepared for the bout, defenseless, and without skills or stamina, and gave up at the end of the round, virtually ending his career with his third consecutive KO loss. It turns out Vivian had only two weeks notice for this fight and had to drop several pounds in a short time, including two pounds on the day of the fight itself. This drained him and caused his performance to suffer.

Vivian fought again in July 2011 against Lanardo Tyner, losing a controversial unanimous decision to him. Harris and several ringside reporters felt he won the fight.

Outside of boxing
In 2009, Harris became the subject of an upcoming television reality series produced by John Edmonds Kozma (producer of Nick Cassavetes's Kentucky Rhapsody") and shot by filmmaker Richard O'Sullivan. The unnamed reality series never aired.

Professional boxing record

References

External links

World light-welterweight boxing champions
1978 births
Living people
Sportspeople from Georgetown, Guyana
Guyanese male boxers
Welterweight boxers
Light-middleweight boxers
World Boxing Association champions
20th-century Guyanese people